The Gambler is a series of five American Western television films starring Kenny Rogers as Brady Hawkes, a fictional old-west gambler. The character was inspired by Rogers' hit single "The Gambler".

There are five movies in the series. The first four were directed by Dick Lowry while the last was directed by Jack Bender. The movies are:

Kenny Rogers as The Gambler (1980)
Kenny Rogers as The Gambler: The Adventure Continues (1983)
Kenny Rogers as The Gambler, Part III: The Legend Continues (1987)
The Gambler Returns: The Luck of the Draw (1991)
Gambler V: Playing for Keeps (1994)

Cast

Films

Kenny Rogers as The Gambler (1980) 

Kenny Rogers as The Gambler debuted on CBS on April 8, 1980. It was a ratings and critical success that has spawned four sequels. The show won a Best Edited Television Special Eddie Award and garnered two Emmy Award nominations (for cinematography and editing of a limited series).

Kenny Rogers stars as Brady Hawkes, the titular gambler, who embarks on a journey to meet Jeremiah (Ronnie Scribner), the young son he never knew after Jeremiah sends him a letter. Along the way, Brady meets Billy Montana (Bruce Boxleitner) and the two become friends. Billy (while trying to help Brady in his quest) fancies himself as a professional poker player on his own. Although Billy makes mistakes along the way (some of these include trying to find a way to cheat or do some smooth talking), Brady makes sure that he stays on good behavior during a train ride to Yuma. The duo help Jennie Reed (Lee Purcell), a prostitute who has trouble with a train baron. At the end, Brady's son's stepfather (Clu Gulager) is confronted.

Kenny Rogers as The Gambler: The Adventure Continues (1983) 

Kenny Rogers again stars as Brady Hawkes in the miniseries Kenny Rogers as The Gambler: The Adventure Continues which premiered on November 28 and 29, 1983. The show was an even bigger ratings success than the first and was nominated for two Emmy Awards (sound editing and sound mixing of a limited series).

Billy Montana, Brady, and his son Jeremiah (now played by Charles Fields) are traveling to a gambling event in San Francisco when they encounter the vicious McCourt gang. The McCourt gang force the train to stop and they take Jeremiah hostage and demand a $1 million ransom. Brady and Billy are determined to get Jeremiah back as well as the $1 million ransom which belonged to the train boss. Brady and Billy find help in their mission and meet a female bounty hunter Kate Muldoon played by Linda Evans. Kate is the fastest female gun in the west. They form a posse together in a race to save Jeremiah.

Cast 
 Linda Evans as Kate Muldoon
 Johnny Crawford as Pete Masket
 Charles Fields as Jeremiah
 David Hedison as Carson
 Bob Hoy as Juno
 Brion James as Reece
 Paul Koslo as Holt
 Cameron Mitchell as Col. Greeley
 Mitchell Ryan as Charlie McCourt
 Gregory Sierra as Silvera
 Ken Swofford as Wichita Pike

Kenny Rogers as The Gambler, Part III: The Legend Continues (1987) 

Kenny Rogers as The Gambler, Part III: The Legend Continues was broadcast on November 22, 1987.

In this installment, Brady Hawkes and Billy Montana help protect some Sioux Indians from the government and some cattle thieves.

Cast 
George Kennedy as Gen. Nelson Miles
Linda Gray as Mary Collins
Marc Alaimo as Pvt. Bob Butler
 Jeff Allin as Homesteader
 George American Horse as Chief Sitting Bull
Michael Berryman as Cpl. Catlett
 Sam Boxleitner as Boy with Hat
 Jeffrey Alan Chandler as Plow Salesman
Melanie Chartoff as Deborah
Richard Chaves as Iron Dog
Matt Clark as Sgt. Grinder
Charles Durning as Sen. Henry Colton
Dean Stockwell as James McLaughlin
Jeffrey Jones as Buffalo Bill Cody

The Gambler Returns: The Luck of the Draw (1991) 
The Gambler Returns: The Luck of the Draw is a 1991 television film starring Kenny Rogers as Brady Hawkes and Reba McEntire as Burgundy Jones. Rogers reprises Hawkes in the fourth installment of the series. The film originally aired on NBC on November 3, 1991. It was nominated for a Costume Design Emmy.

Plot 
It's 1906 and professional gambling will be outlawed in just three weeks. Therefore, Burgundy Jones (McEntire) has just that long to get Brady Hawkes safely to San Francisco for the last poker tournament, with a very special mystery player. This is made more difficult, as Hawkes is still smarting after a hard-fought loss to another professional poker player in England, who will also be at the tournament.

Production 
The film features Rogers' character running across a galaxy of old TV western characters played by the original actors, including Gene Barry as Bat Masterson, Hugh O'Brian as Wyatt Earp, Jack Kelly as Bart Maverick, Clint Walker as Cheyenne Bodie, David Carradine as Kung Fus Caine, Chuck Connors and Johnny Crawford from The Rifleman, Brian Keith as The Westerner, James Drury and Doug McClure from The Virginian (Drury and McClure play thinly disguised different characters, Jim and Doug, due to rights issues for Owen Wister's character), and Paul Brinegar from Rawhide.

The characters are attending a poker game said to be in honor of "the late Mr. Paladin" from Have Gun — Will Travel. (The actor who played him, Richard Boone, had died in 1981.) The game was played at the hotel at which Paladin lived. The game's dealer is "Hey Girl", Paladin's friend. As each veteran character appears, a few bars from his original series' theme momentarily plays in the background.

The Gambler Returns: The Luck of the Draw was directed by Dick Lowry.

Cast 

 Kenny Rogers as Brady Hawkes
 Rick Rossovich as Ethan Cassidy
 Reba McEntire as Burgundy Jones
In alphabetical order:
 Claude Akins as Theodore Roosevelt
 Dion Anderson as Fight Promoter
 Gene Barry as Bat Masterson
 Bruce Boxleitner as Billy Montana
 Paul Brinegar as Cookie
 Jere Burns as Cade Dalton
 David Carradine as Kwai Chang Caine
 Chuck Connors as Lucas McCain
 Johnny Crawford as Mark McCain
 Juliana Donald as Ruby Roy Bean (billed as Juli Donald)
 James Drury as Jim
 Linda Evans as Kate Muldoon
 Brian Keith as The Westerner
 Jack Kelly as Bart Maverick
 Patrick Macnee as Sir Colin
 Doug McClure as Doug
 Hugh O'Brian as Wyatt Earp
 Park Overall as Melody O'Rourke
 Christopher Rich as Lute Cantrell
 Mickey Rooney as The Director
 Brad Sullivan as Judge Roy Bean (recast due to Edgar Buchanan's death)
 Dub Taylor as The Westerner's Friend
 Clint Walker as Cheyenne Bodie

Gambler V: Playing for Keeps (1994) 

Gambler V: Playing for Keeps is the fifth installment of The Gambler series and the first not directed by Dick Lowry, with Jack Bender taking the helm. The movie premiered on October 2, 1994.

Plot 
Brady Hawkes' son, Jeremiah (with Kris Kamm as the third actor in the role) gets involved with outlaws Butch Cassidy (Scott Paulin) and the Sundance Kid (Brett Cullen). Brady tries to save him before he winds up in jail or dead.

Cast 
 Scott Paulin as Butch Cassidy
 Brett Cullen as The Sundance Kid
 Mariska Hargitay as Etta Place
 Kris Kamm as Jeremiah Hawkes
 Stephen Bridgewater as Flatnose Curry
 Richard Riehle as Frank Dimaio
 Ned Vaughn as Ford Hayes
 Martin Kove as Black Jack
 Dixie Carter as Lillie Langtry

Unmade sequel 
On March 15, 2011, Kenny Rogers told Jimmy Fallon on his television show, Late Night with Jimmy Fallon, that he was asked if he would want to be in another Gambler movie. He began by saying that he had a bad knee and thought it would be hard for him, but continued and said that the first scene in the movie would be a shootout. Supposedly, he would get shot in the shoulder and knee to cover his physical disabilities. However, in the years that followed Rogers announced his retirement from show business and stated that his 2016 tour would be his last and after this he would be spending his time with family. Rogers later died on March 20, 2020.

In other media

Books

Slot machine 
A video slot machine based on The Gambler can be found in most Las Vegas casinos. It was manufactured by now-defunct International Game Technology.

References

External links 
IMDB
 
 
 
 
 

AllMovie
 
 
 
 
 

1980s American television miniseries
1990s American television miniseries
1980s Western (genre) television series
1990s Western (genre) television series
1980 American television series debuts
1994 American television series endings
American film series
Cultural depictions of Bat Masterson
Cultural depictions of Butch Cassidy and the Sundance Kid
Cultural depictions of Roy Bean
Cultural depictions of Sitting Bull
Cultural depictions of Theodore Roosevelt
Cultural depictions of Wyatt Earp
Films based on songs
Film series introduced in 1980
Films directed by Dick Lowry
Films about gambling
Television film series
Western (genre) film series